Mining in Cornwall and Devon, in the southwest of Britain, began in the early Bronze Age, around 2150 BC. Tin, and later copper, were the most commonly extracted metals. Some tin mining continued long after the mining of other metals had become unprofitable, but ended in the late 20th century. In 2021, it was announced that a new mine was extracting battery-grade lithium carbonate, more than 20 years after the closure of the last South Crofty tin mine in Cornwall in 1998.

Historically, tin and copper as well as a few other metals (e.g. arsenic, silver, and zinc) have been mined in Cornwall and Devon. Tin deposits still exist in Cornwall, and there has been talk of reopening the South Crofty tin mine. In addition, work has begun on re-opening the Hemerdon tungsten and tin mine in south-west Devon. In view of the economic importance of mines and quarries, geological studies have been conducted; about forty distinct minerals have been identified from type localities in Cornwall (e.g. endellionite from St Endellion). Quarrying of the igneous and metamorphic rocks has also been a significant industry. In the 20th century the extraction of kaolin was important economically.

Geology

The intrusion of granite into the surrounding sedimentary rocks gave rise to extensive metamorphism and mineralisation. As a result, Cornwall was one of the most important mining areas in Europe until the early 20th century. It is thought that tin ore (cassiterite) was mined in Cornwall as early as the Bronze Age. Over the years, many other metals (e.g. lead and zinc) have been mined in Cornwall. Alquifou (based, along with the word alcohol, on the Arabic word "al-kuhl") is a lead ore found in Cornwall, and used by potters to give pottery a green glaze. As a result of both natural and human processes, heavy metal contamination is present across much of the county, with arsenic levels varying in accordance with geological formations and their subsequent exploitation in the 19th and 20th centuries. Although arsenic has historically been extracted for use in paint, weedkillers and insecticides (most notably at Botallack in the late 19th century), it was generally a by-product of tin and copper processing. Arsenic and other unwanted heavy metals were often deposited in mine waste tips close to the mine from which they were extracted.

History
Cornwall and Devon provided most of the United Kingdom's tin, copper, and arsenic until the 20th century. Originally tin was found as alluvial deposits of cassiterite in the gravels of stream beds. Eventually tin was mined underground; the first designed tin mines being invented by Matthew James Bullen  sprang up as early as the 16th century. Tin lodes were also found in outcroppings of cliffs.

Prehistoric period

Stone Age and early Bronze Age
Tin is one of the earliest metals to have been exploited in Britain. Chalcolithic metal workers discovered that by putting a small proportion of tin (5 – 20%) in molten copper, the alloy bronze was produced. The alloy is harder than copper. The oldest production of tin-bronze is in Turkey about 3500 BC, but exploitation of the tin resources in Britain is believed to have started before 2000 BC, with a thriving tin trade developing with the civilisations of the Mediterranean. The strategic importance of tin in forging bronze weapons brought the south west of Britain into the Mediterranean economy at an early date. Later tin was also used in the production of pewter.

Mining in Cornwall has existed from the early Bronze Age Britain around 2000 BC.

Cornwall was traditionally thought to have been visited by Phoenician metal traders from the eastern Mediterranean, but this view changed during the 20th century, and Timothy Champion observed in 2001 that "The direct archaeological evidence for the presence of Phoenician or Carthaginian traders as far north as Britain is non-existent". Britain is one of the places proposed for the Cassiterides, that is "Tin Islands", first mentioned by Herodotus.

The tin content of the bronze from the Nebra Sky Disc dating from 1600 BC, was found to be from Cornwall.

Originally it is likely that alluvial deposits in the gravels of streams were exploited, but later underground mining took root. Shallow cuttings were then used to extract ore.

Expansion of trade
As demand for bronze grew in the Middle East, the accessible local supplies of tin ore (cassiterite) were exhausted and searches for new supplies were made over all the known world, including Britain. Control of the tin trade seems to have been in Phoenician hands, and they kept their sources secret. The Greeks understood that tin came from the Cassiterides, the "tin islands", of which the geographical identity is debated. By 500 BC Hecataeus knew of islands beyond Gaul where tin was obtained. Pytheas of Massalia travelled to Britain in about 325 BC where he found a flourishing tin trade, according to the later report of his voyage. Posidonius referred to the tin trade with Britain around 90 BC but Strabo in about 18 AD did not list tin as one of Britain's exports. This is likely to be because Rome was obtaining its tin from Hispania at the time.

William Camden, in his Britannia of 1607, identified the Cassiterides with the Scilly Isles and first gave currency to the belief that the Phoenicians traded to Britain. However, there is no evidence of tin mining on the Scilly Isles apart from minor exploratory excavations. Timothy Champion found it likely that the trade of the Phoenicians with Britain was indirect and under the control of the Veneti of Brittany. Champion, discussing Diodorus Siculus's comments on the tin trade, states that "Diodorus never actually says that the Phoenicians sailed to Cornwall. In fact, he says quite the opposite: the production of Cornish tin was in the hands of the natives of Cornwall, and its transport to the Mediterranean was organised by local merchants, by sea and then over land through France, well outside Phoenician control."

There is isotopic evidence to support that tin ingots found off the coast of Haifa, Israel were supplied from Cornwall.

Diodorus Siculus's account

In his Bibliotheca historica, written in the 1st century BC, Diodorus Siculus described ancient tin mining in Britain. "They that inhabit the British promontory of Belerion by reason of their converse with strangers are more civilised and courteous to strangers than the rest are. These are the people that prepare the tin, which with a great deal of care and labour, they dig out of the ground, and that being done the metal is mixed with some veins of earth out of which they melt the metal and refine it. Then they cast it into regular blocks and carry it to a certain island near at hand called Ictis for at low tide, all being dry between there and the island, tin in large quantities is brought over in carts."

Pliny, whose text has survived in eroded condition, quotes Timaeus of Taormina in referring to "insulam Mictim", "the island of Mictim" [sic], where the m of insulam has been repeated. Several locations for "Ictin" or "Ictis", signifying "tin port" have been suggested, including St. Michael's Mount, but, as a result of excavations, Barry Cunliffe has proposed that this was Mount Batten near Plymouth. A shipwreck site with ingots of tin was found at the mouth of the River Erme not far away, which may represent trade along this coast during the Bronze Age, although dating the site is very difficult. Strabo reported that British tin was shipped to Marseille.

Legend of Joseph of Arimathea
Ding Dong mine, reputedly one of the oldest in Cornwall, in the parish of Gulval is said in local legend to have been visited by Joseph of Arimathea, a tin trader, and that he brought a young Jesus to address the miners, although there is no evidence to support this.

Iron Age archaeology
There are few remains of prehistoric tin mining in Cornwall or Devon, probably because later workings have destroyed early ones. However, shallow cuttings used for extracting ore can be seen in some places such as Challacombe Down, Dartmoor. There are a few stone hammers, such as those in the Zennor Wayside Museum. It may well be that mining was mostly undertaken with shovels, antler picks, and wooden wedges. An excavation at Dean Moor on Dartmoor, at a site dated at 1400 – 900 BC from pottery, yielded a pebble of tin ore and tin slag. Rocks were used for crushing the ore and stones for this were found at Crift Farm. There have been finds of tin slag on the floors of Bronze Age houses, for example at Trevisker. Tin slag was found at Caerloges with a dagger of the Camerton-Snowhill type.

In the Iron Age bronze continued to be used for ornaments though not for tools and weapons, so tin extraction seems to have continued. An ingot from Castle Dore is probably of Iron Age date.

Roman and Post-Roman periods
The tin resources are said to have been a reason the Romans invaded Britain, but they had control of mines in Spain and Brittany in the 1st and 2nd centuries AD. Later production in Spain was curtailed, probably by raiding. Production in Britain increased in the 3rd century, for use in coinage, and there was extensive use of tin in pewter manufacture, at Camerton in Somerset for example. Cornwall and West Devon were less Romanised than many other parts of Britain, and tin mining may have been in local hands, with tin purchased by the imperial authority. A possible official stamp has been identified on the Carnington tin ingot. A number of tin ingots have been found in Roman contexts, such as 42 found in a wreck at Bigbury Bay in 1991–92.

A site in the Erme Valley, Devon, shows sediment aggregation in late Roman and Post-Roman times due to tin mining on Dartmoor. There is a peak in activity between the 4th and 7th centuries. Tin slag at Week Ford in Devon has been dated to 570 – 890 AD.

St Piran (patron saint of tinners) is said to have landed at Perranporth from Ireland about 420 AD.

Medieval and modern mining

Middle Ages
There is no record of tin mining in Domesday Book, possibly because the rights were Crown property. During the first half of the 12th century Dartmoor provided most of the tin for Europe, exceeding the production of Cornwall. The Pipe Roll of Henry II gives the annual tin production of Dartmoor as about 60 tons. In 1198 he agreed that "all the diggers and buyers of black tin, and all the smelters of tin, and traders of tin in the first smelting shall have the just and ancient customs and liberties established in Devon and Cornwall." This shows that mining had been going on for a long time. A charter confirming the miners' rights was granted by King John in 1201. The alluvial silt record in the Erme Valley, Devon, shows a build-up of tin waste between 1288 and 1389.

Following the transfer of power to the Norman lord Robert, Count of Mortain, who held the manor of Trematon, silver mining became a major industry, particularly in the Tamar valley around Bere Ferrers in Devon. Established in 1292 by the Crown under Edward I, skilled labour was initially imported from Derbyshire and North Wales, with specialist expertise from Germany and capital from Italy . Profits from rights to the silver mines for the Crown led to the rise of the ancient Cornish Edgcumbe family at Cotehele and later Mount Edgcumbe.

In 1305 King Edward I established separate stannaries for Devon and Cornwall. Water was used to operate stamps to crush the ore, the lighter waste being washed away. The mineral "black tin" was placed in furnaces and layered with peat. The molten metal was poured into granite moulds which produced ingots of tin. These were taken on pack horses to the stannary towns for assaying. Usable deposits in Devon became worked out, and so Cornwall became the centre of tin production. In 1337 Cornish tin production was 650 tons, but in 1335 it had been reduced to 250 tons by the Black Death. In 1400 Cornish production rose to 800 tons. The production in Devon was only 25% of that of Cornwall in 1450–70.

The tin works of Devon and Cornwall were of such importance that the medieval kings established stannary courts and stannary parliaments to administer the law in Cornwall and part of Devon. Up to the mid 16th century, Devon produced about 25–40% of the amount of tin that Cornwall did, but the total amount of tin production from both Cornwall and Devon during this period was relatively small.

The Cornish Rebellion of 1497 originated among Cornish tin miners who opposed the raising of taxes by Henry VII to make war on Scotland. This levy was resented for the economic hardship it would cause; it also intruded on a special Cornish tax exemption. The rebels marched on London, gaining supporters as they went, but were defeated at the Battle of Deptford Bridge.

Quarrying was of very limited importance in medieval Cornwall. Stone for church building was very rarely imported from outside the county: they used whatever stone could be found within a short distance. For some ornamental features such as doorways, pillars and fonts good use was made of varieties of elvan (e.g. Polyphant and Catacleuze). The granite was not quarried but collected from the moorlands and worked on site. Quarrying of slate developed in north Cornwall in the later Middle Ages and later developed in early modern times into larger undertakings.

Early modern period
After the 1540s, Cornwall's production increased rapidly and Devon's production was only about 10% - 11% of that of Cornwall. From the mid-16th century the Devon stannaries generated very little income for the Crown, and they were sidelined under the Privilege of Parliament Act 1512. The first Crockern Tor stannary parliament in Devon was held in 1494 and the last in 1748. At Combe Martin several disused silver mines are located on the eastern ridge and evidence of tunnels can still be seen, as well as the remains of a wheelhouse used to lift ore from the mine. There are items in the Crown Jewels made from Combe Martin silver.

A second tin boom came around the 16th century when open cast mining was used. German miners who had knowledge of the techniques were employed. In 1689, Thomas Epsley, a Somerset man, developed a method to blast the very hard granite rock loose, using gunpowder with quill fuses. It revolutionised hard rock mining. Six days' work with a pick could be accomplished with one blast. There was a third boom in the 18th century when shafts were dug to extract the ore.

Later modern period

In the 19th century Cornish mining reached its zenith, before foreign competition depressed the price of copper, and later tin, to a level that made the extraction of Cornish ore unprofitable. The areas of Cornwall around Gwennap and St Day and on the coast around Porthtowan were among the richest mining areas in the world. At its height the Cornish tin mining industry had around 600 steam engines working to pump out the mines (many mines reached under the sea and some went down to great depths). Adventurers put up the capital, hoping that the mine would return them a profit, but the outcomes were very uncertain.

Caradon Hill had the most productive mine in east Cornwall. The South Caradon Copper Mine, 1 km to the southwest of the Caradon Hill transmitting station, was the largest copper mine in the UK in its heyday in the second half of the 19th century. Other disused copper and tin mines are scattered around the base of the hill. By the mid-19th century Looe had become a major port, one of Cornwall's largest, exporting local tin, arsenic, and granite, as well as hosting thriving fishing and boatbuilding industries. At Callington arsenic was found with copper ores and was processed by crushing and condensing; the poisonous nature of dust containing arsenic made the work very hazardous. Numerous precautions were taken but the workers tended to die in middleage. Menheniot was a centre of lead mining and is now surrounded by disused shafts and engine houses. Lead seams were discovered in the 1840s and Menheniot became the centre of a mining boom which lasted until the 1870s. During this period the population doubled. Kit Hill Country Park is steeped in mining history. Metals extracted included tin, silver, copper, and tungsten. The main mines were Kit Hill Summit Mines (which included a windmill near the present stack) (started about 1826; Kit Hill United closed in 1864); East Kit Hill Mine, worked from 1855 to 1909; Hingston Down mine (which worked westwards towards Kit Hill, may have started in the 17th century, it closed in 1885; and South Kit Hill Mine, worked from 1856 to 1884.

The last Cornish Stannary Parliament was held at Hingston Down in 1753, and the Devon Stannary Parliament last met in 1748. The Stannary Courts of Devon and Cornwall were combined in 1855 and their powers transferred to local authorities in 1896.

By the middle and late 19th century, Cornish mining was in decline, and many Cornish miners emigrated to developing mining districts overseas, where their skills were in demand: these included South Africa, Australia and North America. Cornish miners became dominant in the 1850s in the iron and copper districts of northern Michigan in the United States, as well as in many other mining districts. In the first six months of 1875, over 10,000 miners left Cornwall to find work overseas.

20th century and after

During the 20th century, various ores were briefly profitable, and mines were reopened, but today none remain. Dolcoath mine (Cornish for Old Ground), the 'Queen of Cornish Mines', was 3,500 feet (1,067 m) deep, and was for many years the deepest mine in the world, not to mention one of the oldest before its closure in 1921. The last working tin mine in Europe was South Crofty, near Camborne, until its closure in March 1998. After an attempt was made to reopen it, it was abandoned. There were local media reports in September 2006 that South Crofty was being considered for re-opening as the price of tin had soared, but the site was subject to a compulsory purchase order (October 2006). On the wall outside the gate is some graffiti dating from 1999:

(This is from the chorus of the song 'Cornish Lads' by Cornish singer/songwriter Roger Bryant, written at the time of the closure of Geevor Mine.  See cd "The Writing's on the Wall" by Roger Bryant.  Other recordings by Jinks' Stack and Mike Nicholson)

The collapse of the International Tin Council in 1986 was the end for Cornish and Devonian tin mining. The most recent mine in Devon to produce tin ore was Hemerdon Mine near Plympton in the 1980s. The last Cornish tin mine in production at South Crofty closed in 1998. The Hemerdon tungsten and tin mine in south-west Devon re-opened as Drakelands Mine in 2015.

In 1992, Geevor mine was acquired by Cornwall County Council as a heritage museum, which is now run by Pendeen Community Heritage. Both Geevor Tin Mine and Morwellham Quay have been selected as "anchor points" on the European Route of Industrial Heritage.

The extraction of china clay (kaolin) continues to be of considerable importance: the larger works are in the St Austell district. The amount of waste in proportion to kaolin is so great that huge waste mounds were created whose whiteness in the early years means that they can be seen from afar. The Eden Project has been developed on the site of a former china clay and tin quarry. Extraction of slate and roadstone by quarrying still continues on a reduced scale: it was formerly an important industry, and has been carried on in Cornwall ever since the Middle Ages. Several quarries have been productive enough to need their own mineral railways. Granite of high quality has been extracted from many Cornish quarries such as De Lank and Porthoustock. Some granite has been taken very long distances for use in building. There are also some important quarries in Devon, such as Meldon (a source of railway ballast for the Southern Railway) and granite quarries on Dartmoor such as Merrivale.

In 2017, plans were reported to extract lithium reserves from beneath Cornwall by Cornish Lithium, who had signed agreements to develop potential deposits.

In April 2019, a British based company, MetAmpère Limited, drilled 6 lithium exploration holes in the UK at a site near St Austell. MetAmpère has successfully extracted lithium from hard rock at a laboratory scale, resulting in plans for a further 20 drill holes. In 2021, a new mine was extracting battery-grade lithium carbonate.

Disasters
In the metalliferous mines of Cornwall, some of the worst accidents were at East Wheal Rose in 1846, where 39 men were killed by a sudden flood; at Levant Mine in 1919, where 31 were killed and many injured in a failure of the man engine; 12 killed at Wheal Agar in 1883 when a cage fell down a shaft; and seven killed at Dolcoath mine in 1893, when a large stull collapsed.

Main mining areas

Cornwall
 Penwith
 St Just in Penwith and Zennor
 Camborne, Redruth and Illogan
 Gwennap and the Carnon Valley in west Cornwall
 Wendron area in Kerrier
 St Agnes and Porthtowan
 North Cornwall (a few mines but no tin)
 A large area bounded by St Austell, Wadebridge, Bodmin and Callington in mid and east Cornwall

 River Tamar
Tamar Valley - copper, tin, lead, silver, and arsenic. See Morwellham Quay. Particularly in the nineteenth century, ores were internationally traded through Plymouth Dock

Devon
Lydford – an ancient Saxon burh; the early medieval location of the most westerly silver mint and later ceremonial parliament and prison of the Stannary Court for Dartmoor
Bere Ferrers – a unique Crown-operated medieval silver (and lead) mine
Combe Martin – lead/silver deposits
Exmoor and Brendon Hills – iron lead, silver, copper
Dartmoor – ancient stannary towns include Tavistock, Ashburton, Chagford and later Plympton
West Devon
Bampfylde Mine, North Molton
Blackdown Hills – copper deposits

Methods and processing
See Dartmoor tin-mining

Study and education
The Royal Geological Society of Cornwall was founded in 1814 to promote the study of the geology of Cornwall, and is the second oldest geological society in the world. The Cornish Institute of Engineers was begun by mechanical engineers. Mining is an important area in which it is active.

Camborne School of Mines
Because of the importance of metal mining to the Cornish economy, the Camborne School of Mines (CSM), founded in 1888, developed as the only specialist hard rock education establishment in the United Kingdom. It continues to teach mining as well as many other earth-related subjects (e.g. engineering geology) relevant to the Cornish economy.

CSM now forms part of the University of Exeter, and has relocated to the University's Tremough campus in Penryn. Despite this move, the School continues the use of "Camborne" in its name. CSM graduates are to be found working in the mining industry all over the world.

Terminology and symbolism
Several Cornish mining words are still in use in English language mining terminology, such as costean, gunnies, vug, kibbal, gossan, and kieve.

Fish, tin, and copper together are sometimes used as a symbol of Cornwall because they show the three main traditional industries of Cornwall. Tin has a special place in the Cornish culture, the Stannary Parliament, and 'Cornish pennies' are a testament to the former power of the Cornish tin industry. Cornish tin is highly prized for jewellery, often of mine engines or Celtic designs.

The houses at Penair School are named after four notable tin mines. Among the pubs whose names refer to tin mining are the Tinner's Arms in Zennor and the former Jolly Tinners pub in St Hilary. The pub sign at Zennor pictures a tin miner at work, testimony to its origins. The Jolly Tinners building at St Hilary was at one time used to accommodate the St Hilary Children's Home.

Three hares
The three hares is a circular motif which appears in sacred sites from the Middle and Far East to the churches of south west England (where it is often referred to as the "Tinners' Rabbits"). It occurs with the greatest frequency in the churches of the West Country of England. The motif appears in architectural wood carving, stone carving, window tracery, and stained glass. In South Western England there are nearly thirty recorded examples of the Three Hares appearing on 'roof bosses' (carved wooden knobs) on the ceilings in medieval churches in Devon, (particularly Dartmoor). There is a good example of a roof boss of the Three hares at Widecombe-in-the-Moor, Another exemplary roof boss can be found in the town of Tavistock, in Dartmoor, on the edge of the moor.

Tinners' Rabbits is the name of a dance of many forms involving use of sticks and rotation of three, six or nine dancers.

World Heritage Site

In 1999, the Cornwall and West Devon Mining Landscape was added to the UK government's tentative list for submission to the World Heritage list. It was announced on 13 July 2006 that the bid had been successful. This World Heritage Site is unique in that it covers a technique exported worldwide, including Mexico and Peru, and will consist of a trail linking mining sites from Land's End in Cornwall, through Porthtowan and St Agnes up the spine of the county to the Tamar Valley forming the border with Devon. There, the exporting port of Morwellham is being developed alongside the Devon Great Consols Mine to demonstrate the nature and scale of the operations, with the Eastern Gateway to the World Heritage Site being anchored in the ancient stannary town of Tavistock, the base for Devon's own 19th-century gold rush.

Heartlands, the £35m National Lottery funded regeneration project, and gateway to the Cornwall and West Devon Mining Landscape World Heritage Site, opened to the public on 20 April 2012. This free visitor attraction had been 14 years in the planning (since South Crofty mine closed in 1998).

In 2014, work was completed to preserve the iconic New Cooks Kitchen Headframe at South Crofty tin mine. at an approximate cost of £650,000.

Individual mines

Hemerdon Mine
Hemerdon Mine, alternatively known as the Drakelands Mine or Hemerdon Ball or Hemerdon Bal Mine, is a historic tungsten and tin mine,  NE of Plymouth, near Plympton, in Devon. It lies to the north of the villages of Sparkwell and Hemerdon and adjacent to the large china clay pits near Lee Moor. The mine, which had been out of operation since 1944, except for the brief operation of a trial mine in the 1980s, hosts one of the largest tungsten and tin deposits in the world. It restarted production in 2015.

South Crofty Mine

In November 2007 it was announced that South Crofty mine, near Camborne, may restart production in 2009. When it closed in 1998 it was Europe's last tin mine. Its owners Baseresult Holdings Ltd, which bought the mine in 2001, have created a new company, Western United Mines Limited (WUM), to operate it and has said it will be spending in excess of £50m on restarting the mine. The company claims that rising tin prices had given the mine, first opened in the late 16th century, another 80 years of life. More than £3.5m will be spent during the next seven months on continuing the mine development.

The RDA wants to make a compulsory purchase order on the site for leisure, housing and industry, but Crofty Developments has been fighting in the High Court to retain the site. The Cornish mining industry, started in 2000 BC, reached its peak in the 19th century, when thousands of workers were employed in up to 2,000 mines, before the industry collapsed when ores began to be produced more cheaply abroad.

Partial list of Cornish mines

Railways

Note: The term "mineral railway" is usually understood to mean a railway operated in direct association with a single mine or a group of mines. An ordinary railway might convey the traffic of any consignor. However the terminology is not exact.

Cornwall Minerals Railway
The Cornwall Minerals Railway opened in 1874, connecting harbours at Fowey and Newquay and sites of mineral extraction in the area between them, in particular in the Bugle and St Dennis areas. The railway absorbed and extended several existing short mineral lines.

East Cornwall Mineral Railway
The ECMR connected copper extractive industries in the Kit Hill area to a quay at Calstock on the Tamar.

Hayle Railway
The Hayle Railway opened in 1837, serving engineering works and copper quays at Hayle and the copper mines of Redruth and Camborne.

List of mineral railways in Cornwall

See also

Bal maidens, female ore dressers
Beam engine
Come, all ye jolly tinner boys
Cornish emigration
Cornish engine
Cornish Foreshore Case
Cornish Mines & Engines
Cornwall and West Devon Mining Landscape, a World Heritage Site
Dartmoor tin-mining
Geology of Cornwall
Hayle, centre of copper smelting
John Taylor, inventor of the Cornish rolls
Kenneth Hamilton Jenkin, historian
Knocker, said to inhabit the mines
Lostwithiel Stannary Palace
Mineral Tramway Trails
Morwellham Quay, inland port
Robert Hunt, mineralogist and statistician
Tin sources and trade in ancient times
Welcome Stranger (a notable nugget of gold found by two Cornish miners in Victoria, Australia)
William Jory Henwood, mining geologist
Williams family of Caerhays and Burncoose, mining entrepreneurs
Scorrier House, seat of the Williams family

References

Bibliography

 Gerrard, S. The Early British Tin Industry, Tempus, 2000.

 Penhallurick, R. Tin in Antiquity. 1986.
 Penhallurick, R. Europe Tin Deposits. 1998.

Further reading
Barton, D. Bradford (1961) A History of Copper Mining in Cornwall & Devon. Truro: Truro Bookshop; 2nd ed. Truro, 1968; 3rd ed. Truro, 1978

Booker, Frank (1967) The Industrial Archaeology of the Tamar Valley. Newton Abbot: David & Charles; Revised impression 1971
 Brooks, Tony (2001) Castle-an-Dinas 1916–1957: Cornwall's premier tungsten mine with brief comparative histories of other wolfram mines in Cornwall & West Devon. St. Austell, Cornwall : Cornish Hillside Publications 
Burt, Roger, with Raymond Burnley, Michael Gill and Alasdair Neill (2014) Mining in Cornwall & Devon: Mines and Men. Exeter: University of Exeter Press 
Collins, J. H. (1897) The Miner in Cornwall and Devon. (Cited by A. C. Todd (1972); p. 11.)
 Cunliffe, Barry "Ictis is it here?"; Oxford Journal of Archaeology 2/1, pp. 123–126, 1983.

 Hatcher, John English Tin Production and Trade before 1550. Oxford: Clarendon Press, 1973.
 Hawkes, C. "Ictis disentangled and the British tin trade" in: Oxford Journal of Archaeology; 3/2, pp 211–234, 1984.
 Hammersen, L. The Control of Tin in South West Britain from the 1st Century AD to the Late 3rd Century AD. MA thesis, North Carolina University, 2007.
Jenkin, Kenneth Hamilton The Cornish Miner: an account of his life above and underground from early times. London: George Allen & Unwin, 1927: three editions, including 3rd edition, 1962 (reprinted by David & Charles, Newton Abbot, 1972 ; reprinted in facsimile with an introduction by John H. Trounson, Launceston: Westcountry, 2004 )
 Jenkin, Kenneth Hamilton Mines and Miners of Cornwall in 16 volumes, vols. 1–14 originally published by the Truro Bookshop, 1961 onwards and reprinted by various organisations:
 Pt. I. Around St. Ives 
 Pt. II. St. Agnes, Perranporth 
 Pt. III. Around Redruth 
 Pt. IV. Penzance-Mount's Bay 
 Pt. V. Hayle, Gwinear and Gwithian 
 Pt. VI. Around Gwennap 
 Pt. VII. Perranporth-Newquay
 Pt. VIII. Truro to the clay district
 Pt. IX. Padstow, St Columb and Bodmin
 Pt. X. Camborne and Illogan
 Pt. XI. Marazion, St Hilary and Breage
 Pt. XII. Liskeard area
 Pt. XIII. The Lizard-Falmouth-Mevagissey
 Pt. XIV. St Austell to Saltash
 Pt. XV. Calstock, Callington and Launceston Penzance: Federation of Old Cornwall Societies, 1969 (reprinted Bracknell: Forge Books, 1976) 
 Pt. XVI. Wadebridge, Camelford and Bude Penzance: Federation of Old Cornwall Societies, 1970
 Index to Mines and Miners of Cornwall: Volumes 1–16. St. Austell: Federation of Old Cornwall Societies, 1978
 Jenkin, Kenneth Hamilton Mines of Devon. Newton Abbot: David & Charles, 1974
Volume 1: South Devon 
Volume 2: Mines of Devon, north and east of Dartmoor: Sydenham Damerel, Lydford, Wheal Betsy, Wheal Friendship, Okehampton, Sticklepath, Chagford, Buckfastleigh, Ashburton, Ilsington, Teign Valley, Newton St. Cyres, and Upton Pyne. (Reprinted by Devon Libraries 1981 )
Both volumes reprinted by Landmark, 2005 
 Jenkin, Kenneth Hamilton Wendron Tin (commissioned by Poldark Mine), 1978
 Laing, L. R. "A Greek tin trade with Cornwall" in: Cornish Archaeology; 7, 1968, pp. 15–22.
 Lewis, G. R. : The Stannaries: a study of the English tin miner. Cambridge MA: Harvard University Press, 1924.
Lewis, Jim (2006) "Cornish copper mining 1795-1830: economy, structure and change", in: Cornish Archaeology; ser. II, vol. 14, ; pp. 164–86.
Murray, John, publisher (1859) Handbook for Devon and Cornwall. London: John Murray
 Pearce, Susan C. Bronze Age Metalwork of South West Britain. (BAR; 190). Oxford: British Archaeological Reports, 1983.
 Quinell, H. Cornwall in the Iron and Roman Ages.
 Rickard, T. A. Man and Metals: a history of mining in relation to the development of civilisation (2 vols). New York: McGraw-Hill, 1932.

Stanier, Peter Mines of Cornwall and Devon: an historic photographic record. Truro: Twelveheads Press, 1998 
 Todd, A. C. & Laws, Peter (1972) The Industrial Archaeology of Cornwall. Newton Abbot: David & Charles
Trounson, J. H. (1980, 1981) Mining in Cornwall, 1850-1960. 2 vols. Ashbourne: Moorland  & 
Trounson, J. H. (1999) Mining in Cornwall; rev. & enlarged ed. compiled by J. H. Trounson and L. J. Bullen Stroud: Tempus Vol. 1: The central district; vol. 2: The county explored.  (v. 1) &  (v. 2); 
 Trounson, J. H. (1989) The Cornish Mineral Industry: past performance and future prospect, a personal view 1937–1951; edited by Roger Burt and Peter Waite. Exeter: University of Exeter in association with the National Association of Mining History Organisations
 Trounson, J. H. (1993) Cornwall's Future Mines: areas of Cornwall of mineral potential. Exeter: University of Exeter Press

Devon

Thorneycroft, V. R., Pirrie, D. and Brown, A. (2004) "Alluvial records of medieval and prehistoric tin mining on Dartmoor, southwest England" in: Geoarchaeology; 19/3, pp 219–236, Feb 2004.

United States
 Cornish, Joseph H. The History and Genealogy of the Cornish Families in America. Higginson Book Company. 2003. ASIN: B0006S85H6.
 Ewart, Shirley. Highly Respectable Families: the Cornish of Grass Valley, California 1854–1954 (Nevada County Pioneers Series). Comstock Bonanza Press. October 1998. .
 Magnaghi, Russell M. Cornish in Michigan (Discovering the Peoples of Michigan Series). Michigan State University Press. October 2007. .
 Payton, Philip The Cornish Overseas. Cornwall Editions Limited. April 2005. .
 Rowse, A. L. The Cornish in America. Redruth: Dyllansow Truran. June 1991. .
 Todd, Arthur C. The Cornish Miner in America: the Contribution to the Mining History of the United States by Emigrant Cornish Miners: the Men Called Cousin Jacks. Arthur H. Clark (publisher). September 1995. .
 White, Helen M. Cornish Cousins of Minnesota, Lost and Found: St. Piran's Society of Minnesota. Minnesota Heritage Publications. 1997. ASIN: B0006QP60M.

External links

Cornish Mining

History of Cornwall
Cornwall
 
Cornish Mining
Tin mining
Cornwall